Corynebacterium efficiens is a thermotolerant, glutamic acid-producing (from dextrin) species of bacteria from soil and vegetables. Its type strain is YS-314T (= AJ 12310T = JCM 11189T = DSM 44549T).

References

Further reading

External links
 
 LPSN
 Type strain of Corynebacterium efficiens at BacDive -  the Bacterial Diversity Metadatabase

Corynebacterium
Gram-positive bacteria
Bacteria described in 2002